The three-banded plover, or three-banded sandplover (Charadrius tricollaris), is a small wader. This  plover is resident and generally sedentary in much of East Africa, southern Africa and Madagascar. It occurs mainly on inland rivers, pools, lakes and pans, frequenting their exposed shores. This species is often seen as single individuals, but it will form small flocks. It hunts by sight for insects, worms and other invertebrates. Three-banded plovers have a sharp whistled weeet-weet call. Its larger and darker-plumaged sister species, Forbes's plover, replaces it in West Africa and in the moist tropics. The two species have largely allopatric breeding ranges. Both species present a distinctively elongated profile, due to their proportionally long tail and wings.

Description
 
The adult three-banded plover is 18 cm in length. It has long wings and a very long tail, and therefore looks different from most other small plovers in flight, the exception being the closely related Forbes's plover. 

The adult three-banded plover has medium brown upperparts, and the underparts are white except for the two black breast bands, separated by a white band, which give this species its common and scientific names. The head is strikingly patterned, with a black crown, white supercilia extending from the white forehead to meet on the back of the neck, and a grey face becoming brown on the neck. The orbital ring is orange-red, and the base of the otherwise black bill is rosy red in colour.

The Malagasy subspecies C. t. bifrontatus has a grey band between the bill and the white forehead, and the sides of the head are grey. A genetic study reported genetic differentiation between Madagascar and the mainland population. The sexes are similar with respect to plumage and size. Juveniles of the nominate and Malagasy subspecies also resemble the adults, although the forehead is brownish for a short time, and the wing coverts show buff fringes. This species is distinguished from the larger and darker Forbes's plover in that the latter has a brown forehead and lacks a white wingbar.

Breeding
Its nest is a bare scrape on shingle. Egg laying occurs from March to June in the tropics, but mainly (over 70%) from July to October (i.e. late winter to early spring) in southern Africa.

References

 Ian Sinclair, Phil Hockey and Warwick Tarboton, SASOL Birds of Southern Africa (Struik 2002) 
 Hayman, Marchant and Prater Shorebirds

External links

 Three-banded plover - Species text in The Atlas of Southern African Birds.

three-banded plover
Birds of Africa
three-banded plover
three-banded plover